Steven Dennis "Clem" Grogan (born July 13, 1951) is an American convicted murderer and former member of the Manson Family. He was released from prison in 1985, the only person paroled after being convicted of murder in the killings committed by the Family.

Biography
Grogan, a musician and artist, dropped out of high school and was involved in minor crimes. When his frustrated parents lost hope, they decided to drop him off at Spahn Ranch. He was immediately taken in by the ranch hands and began to do odd jobs around the ranch. Ranch hand Donald Shea took a liking to Grogan, often buying him clothes. Like Charles Manson, he was friends with Dennis Wilson of the Beach Boys. He was often considered dumb, or even "retarded", by other Family members, earning him the nickname "Scramblehead", but some felt he was only "playing dumb". Allegedly, it was Grogan who wrecked Wilson's uninsured Ferrari. In 1969, he was sentenced to 90 days observation at Camarillo State Mental Hospital for exposing his penis to a group of school children, but he returned to the ranch after two days.

On the night of August 10, 1969, he rode with members of the Manson family. Charles Watson, Patricia Krenwinkel and Leslie Van Houten were dropped off at the house of Leno and Rosemary LaBianca, but Grogan, Manson, Susan Atkins and Linda Kasabian continued to Venice Beach where, according to Kasabian, Manson sent Grogan, Atkins and Kasabian to kill actor Saladin Nader, but Kasabian led them to the wrong apartment and the plan was aborted.

Grogan later helped Manson, Watson and Bruce M. Davis kill Spahn ranch hand Donald Shea. The jury returned verdicts of life imprisonment for Manson and Davis, but death for Grogan. However, on December 23, 1971, Judge James Kolts stated that "Grogan was too stupid and too hopped on drugs to decide anything on his own" and that it was really Manson "who decided who lived or died" and reduced Grogan's sentence to life imprisonment.

Grogan later assisted the authorities and drew a map to where Shea's body was buried. In prison he was head of the prison's program to deter juveniles from a life of crime and kept away from fellow inmate Manson. Grogan was released on parole from prison in 1985.

On January 5, 1971, fellow Manson Family member Catherine Share gave birth to a son while in jail awaiting trial; she later revealed that Grogan was the father.

Grogan played guitar and sang in the Freedom Orchestra Band with fellow Manson family conspirator Bobby Beausoleil when they both served time at the Deuel Vocational Institute in Tracy, California. Beausoleil later revealed that he convinced Grogan to begin the guitar, even making one. As of November 2022, Grogan is the only person who has been released from prison after being convicted of murder in the killings committed by the Manson Family.

Media
Grogan was one of the people featured in the Oscar-nominated 1973 documentary film Manson.

Grogan is portrayed by James Landry Hébert in the 2019 film Once Upon a Time in Hollywood.

References

1951 births
Living people
American people convicted of murder
American prisoners sentenced to death
Criminals from Los Angeles
Crimes involving Satanism or the occult
People convicted of murder by California
Prisoners sentenced to death by California
People paroled from life sentence
Manson Family